Margarella jason is a species of sea snail, a marine gastropod mollusk in the family Calliostomatidae.

Description
The height of the shell attains 10 mm.

Distribution
This marine species occurs off the South Georgia Islands at depths between 238 m and 270 m.

References

 Powell, A. W. B. 1951. Antarctic and Subantarctic Mollusca: Pelecypoda and Gastropoda. Discovery Reports 26: 47-196, pls. 5-10.

External links
 To Biodiversity Heritage Library (2 publications)
 To Encyclopedia of Life
 To World Register of Marine Species

jason
Gastropods described in 1951